Jacob Koschitzke (born 11 July 2000) is a professional Australian rules footballer with the Hawthorn Football Club in the Australian Football League (AFL).

Early career

Jacob Koschitzke was born and raised in the New South Wales regional town of Albury and is the cousin of former  forward Justin Koschitzke. He was a part of the Greater Western Sydney Giants' developmental academy until 2016 when Albury was removed from their zone.

Standing at 196cm tall, the youngster was used as swingman from the Murray Bushrangers, and was rated among the best key position prospects in the 2018 draft. He had an impressive national U18 championships for the Allies which resulted in an All-Australian selection in the position of fullback.

AFL career

Koschitzke's AFL career started by playing with the Hawthorn affiliate Box Hill Hawks. Here, under the tutelage of Hawthorn aligned coaches, he spent his first year developing for the rigors of AFL football. A key position player with strong hands and a penetrating kick, he reads the game well. He is composed with the ball in hand and makes good decisions providing defensive rebound.

Koschitzke had to negotiate a difficult COVID-19 affected season. He showed promise during the pre-season games and with scratch matches against other AFL clubs. Later in the year he was moved to the forward line and seemed to thrived.
A big pre-season in 2021 and a dominant game at full forward against  in which he kicked six goals showed that he was ready for the big time.

Koschitzke played his first AFL game for Hawthorn as part of the trio that debuted in the opening round of the 2021 AFL season against Essendon at Marvel Stadium.

Statistics
Updated to the end of the 2022 season.

|-
| 2019 ||  || 34
| 0 || — || — || — || — || — || — || — || — || — || — || — || — || — || — || 0
|-
| 2020 ||  || 34
| 0 || — || — || — || — || — || — || — || — || — || — || — || — || — || — || 0
|-
| 2021 ||  || 34
| 20 || 27 || 19 || 98 || 65 || 163 || 77 || 37 || 1.4 || 1.0 || 4.9 || 3.3 || 8.2 || 3.9 || 1.9 || 3
|-
| 2022 ||  || 23
| 16 || 18 || 8 || 81 || 44 || 125 || 36 || 41 || 1.1 || 0.5 || 5.1 || 2.8 || 7.8 || 2.3 || 2.6 || 0
|- class="sortbottom"
! colspan=3| Career
! 36 !! 45 !! 27 !! 179 !! 109 !! 288 !! 113 !! 78 !! 1.3 !! 0.8 !! 5.0 !! 3.0 !! 8.0 !! 3.1 !! 2.2 !! 3
|}

Notes

Honours and achievements
Individual
 AFL Rising Star nominee: 2021
  best first year player (debut season): 2021
 Under 18 All-Australian team: 2018

References

External links

Living people
2000 births
Albury Football Club players
Box Hill Football Club players
Hawthorn Football Club players
Australian people of Polish descent
Murray Bushrangers players
Australian rules footballers from Albury